USS Experiment was a schooner in the United States Navy during the Quasi-War with France.

Experiment was built in 1799 at Baltimore, Maryland; and first put to sea late in November 1799, Lieutenant W. Maley in command.

Experiment joined the squadron commanded by Captain Silas Talbot on the Santo Domingo station, and for seven months, cruised against French privateers in the Caribbean, taking a number of valuable prizes. On 1 January 1800, while becalmed in the Bight of Leogane with a convoy of four merchantmen, Experiment was attacked by 11 armed pirate boats, manned by about four or five hundred buccaneers. In the seven hours of fighting that followed, the pirates boarded one of the merchantmen, killing her captain, and towed off two other ships of the convoy after their crews had abandoned them. But Experiment sank two of the attacking craft, and killed and wounded many of the pirates, suffering only one man wounded.

Arriving in the Delaware River early in July 1800, Experiment refitted, and returned to the West Indies under new commander, Lieutenant Charles Stewart Jr. Again successful in her patrols against the French, she captured several armed vessels, one of which was carrying a high-ranking army officer. She also recaptured a number of American merchantmen, and in January 1801 rescued 65 Spaniards from the ship Eliza, wrecked on a reef of the island of Saona.

Experiment returned to Norfolk early in February 1801, and was laid up there until August, when she sailed to Baltimore. There, she was sold in October 1801.

References

Schooners of the United States Navy
Quasi-War ships of the United States
1799 ships